Haggag Hassan Oddoul (born 1944) is an Egyptian writer of Nubian descent, and a campaigner for the rights of the Nubian people.

Life and work
He was born in Alexandria of Nubian parents who had left their impoverished native village. From 1963 to 1967 he was a construction worker on the Aswan High Dam. Later, he served in the Egyptian army, where he saw action in both the War of Attrition and the October 1973 War. He didn't begin writing until the age of forty. His works have received several Egyptian literary awards, and he obtained government grants for the years 1996-98 and 2002–03, to complete his novels.

Most of his work attempts to preserve various aspects of the gradually disappearing Nubian culture and language. He is often regarded as one of a group of contemporary Nubian authors, the others being Idris Ali, Hasan Nur and Yehya Mukhtar.

In translation

 Nights of Musk: Stories from Old Nubia, translated by Anthony Calderbank, American University in Cairo Press (2005) 
 My Uncle Is On Labor, translated by Ahmed Fathy, Al-Hadara Publishing (2008)

References

1944 births
Egyptian people of Nubian descent
Egyptian writers
Living people
Nubian people